Anita Wawatai (born 7 December 1980) is a New Zealand field hockey player who competed in the 2006 Commonwealth Games and the 2008 Summer Olympics.

References

External links
 

1980 births
Living people
New Zealand female field hockey players
Female field hockey goalkeepers
Olympic field hockey players of New Zealand
Field hockey players at the 2008 Summer Olympics
Commonwealth Games competitors for New Zealand
Field hockey players at the 2006 Commonwealth Games